Huey P. Long Field House, on the campus of Louisiana State University in Baton Rouge, Louisiana, was constructed in 1932. It was named for notable U.S. Senator and state governor Huey Long. The field house is considered the original student union and included a post office, ballroom, gymnasium and also featured the largest swimming pool in the United States at the time.

The field house was home to the LSU Tigers and LSU Lady Tigers swimming and diving teams until the LSU Natatorium was built in 1985. The former LSU varsity hockey team used the field house as their home venue and the former LSU Tigers boxing team also held matches at the field house in addition to Parker Coliseum.

The building is currently the home of LSU's Department of Kinesiology and School of Social Work.

In 2013, plans to renovate the field house were introduced by LSU, State of Louisiana Facility Planning & Control, and Baton Rouge architecture firm Tipton Associates, APAC. In December 2018, LSU contracted Tipton Associates, in a joint-venture with Remson Haley Herpin Architects, to renovate the field house, and construction began in 2020.

See also
LSU Tigers and Lady Tigers
LSU Tigers boxing
LSU Tigers swimming and diving
LSU Lady Tigers swimming and diving

References

External links
LSU Alumni Association
SaveHPL.org

Boxing venues in Louisiana
College swimming venues in the United States
Defunct boxing venues in the United States
Defunct college ice hockey venues in the United States
Defunct sports venues in Louisiana
Indoor arenas in Louisiana
Indoor ice hockey venues in Louisiana
LSU Tigers boxing venues
LSU Tigers and Lady Tigers swimming and diving venues
Sports venues in Louisiana
Swimming venues in Louisiana
Louisiana State University buildings and structures
Sports venues completed in 1932
1932 establishments in Louisiana
Huey Long